Schizomyia racemicola is a species of fly in the family Cecidomyiidae. This gall midge species induces galls on goldenrods in eastern North America. It was first described by Carl Robert Osten-Sacken in 1862.

References

Cecidomyiinae
Articles created by Qbugbot
Insects described in 1862

Taxa named by Carl Robert Osten-Sacken
Diptera of North America
Gall-inducing insects